Akkarakazhchakal: The Movie is a 2011 American Malayalam film based upon the popular TV series Akkara Kazhchakal.

Plot
The Thekkinmuttil family decides to send Appachan and Ammachi to an old-age home in Kerala. To take a break out of their regular lives they decide to make the long-pending trip to Niagara Falls.

Cast
 Josekutty Valiyakallumkal as George Thekkinmootil (Chettai), a government employee as well as struggling insurance agent
 Sajini Sachariah as Rincy, George's wife and a nurse by profession
 Jacob Gregory as Gregory (Girigiri), George's assistant insurance agent
 Paulose Palatty as Appachan, George's father, temporarily visiting from India
 Hari Dev as Mahesh (Mahi), a Malayalee nurse, obsessed with women 
 Sanjeev Nair as Babykuttan, a Malayalee nurse who is trying to find a wife
 Alvin George as Matt (Mathaikunju), George's son
 Reshma Kuttappassery as Chakkimol, George's daughter
 Geo Thomas as Baiju, a software engineer
 Jayan Joseph as Krishnankutty Nair (Krish), a software engineer
 Shine Roy as Shiny, Rincy's friend who loves to show off her wealth
 Saji Sebastin as Jacob Embranthiri, a wine-loving scientist and Shiny's husband
Sunny Kalloopara as Ikkili Chacko
Peter Neendoor as Chackochan
Jose Paramus as Achan

Production
The TV series became popular through YouTube and was later aired on Kairali TV in 2008. The series was conceptualized, written and directed by New Jersey-based Ajayan Venugopal and Abi Verghese. The series ended after 50 episodes and the team put together a stage show based on the series. Based on the positive feedback from the show, they decided to make a film based on the series.

The film is produced by Bom TV, a US-based Internet TV provider. The screenplay is written by Ajayan Venugopal. Ajayan Venugopal and Abi Verghese are handling the direction. Hyder Bilgrami is the director of cinematography. Kedar Kumar has composed the music. Hyder Bilgrami is the film editor. The pooja of the film was held on 3 September 2010 at Orangeburg, New York. Filming commenced on the same date. A teaser trailer appeared on the official Akkara Kazhchakal YouTube page on 22 September 2010. It was announced on the official facebook page on 10 November 2010 that filming has been completed and the post-production works had begun. The film released in the United States on 29 April 2011.

References

External links
 
 
 

Films about Indian Americans
2010s Malayalam-language films
Comedy films about Asian Americans
2010s American films